Bass Creek  is a stream in Boone County in the U.S. state of Missouri. It is a tributary of Bonne Femme Creek, which flows into the Missouri River. The creek is one of the "three creeks" of Three Creeks Conservation Area. It is a losing stream and some of its water flows through Hunters Cave. The creek is named after Eli Bass, whose plantation it flowed through for much of the 1800s.

See also
List of rivers of Missouri

References

Rivers of Boone County, Missouri
Rivers of Missouri